Munida chydaea is a species of squat lobster in the family Munididae. It was first described in 2004 by Shane Ahyong and Gary Poore.The species name is derived from the Greek , "abundant", in reference to how numerous the species is.

in 2021, this species was synonymised with Munida gracilis Henderson, 1885  which is accepted by WoRMS as Scolonida gracilis (Henderson, 1885).

References

Squat lobsters
Crustaceans described in 2004
Taxa named by Shane T. Ahyong